Cristodesisa is a genus of longhorn beetles of the subfamily Lamiinae, containing the following species:

 Cristodesisa perakensis Breuning, 1959
 Cristodesisa vicina Breuning, 1972

References

Pteropliini